Sergey Viktorovich Samok (born 15 February 2001) is a Russian football player. He plays for FC Rotor Volgograd.

Club career
He made his debut in the Russian Football National League for FC SKA-Khabarovsk on 13 October 2021 in a game against FC Fakel Voronezh.

References

External links
 
 
 Profile by Russian Football National League

2001 births
People from Talmensky District
Sportspeople from Altai Krai
Living people
Russian footballers
Association football goalkeepers
PFC Sochi players
FC SKA-Khabarovsk players
FC Rotor Volgograd players
Russian First League players
Russian Second League players